William Ayres Arrowsmith (April 13, 1924 – February 21, 1992) was an American classicist, academic, and translator.

Life
Born in Orange, New Jersey, the son of Walter Weed Arrowsmith and Dorothy (Ayres) Arrowsmith, William grew up in Wellesley, Massachusetts. He went to schools in Massachusetts and Florida, then The Hill School received a A.B. summa cum laude and Phi Beta Kappa and a Ph.D. from Princeton University, and also earned bachelor's and master's degrees from Oxford University. Arrowsmith was a Rhodes Scholar while at Oxford and later received Wilson, Guggenheim and Rockefeller fellowships. He was awarded ten honorary degrees.

Arrowsmith is remembered for his translations of Petronius's Satyricon (1959) and Aristophanes' plays The Birds (1961) and The Clouds (1962), as well as Euripides' Alcestis, Cyclops, Heracles, Orestes, Hecuba, and The Bacchae, and other classical and contemporary works. He was the general editor of the 33-volume The Greek Tragedy in New Translations (Oxford, 1973) and of Nietzsche's Unmodern Observations (Yale, 1989). Arrowsmith also translated modern works, including The Storm and Other Things (Norton, 1985) by Eugenio Montale, the Nobel laureate Italian poet; Hard Labor (Grossman, 1976) by Cesare Pavese, for which he won the U.S. National Book Award in category Translation (a split award); 
and Six Modern Italian Novellas (Pocket Books, 1964). He is known for his writings on Italian film director Michelangelo Antonioni. A prolific writer and editor, he founded and edited The Hudson Review and later Arion and served on the editorial board of Delos, Mosaic, American Poetry Review and Pequod.

An academic for most of his life, Arrowsmith served as chairman of the Classics Department at the University of Texas as well as a professor at Boston University, Princeton University, MIT, Yale, Johns Hopkins University, NYU, and Emory University. He gained notoriety with his attacks on graduate education in the humanities in the 1960s, particularly in a Phi Beta Kappa lecture on "The Shame of the Graduate Schools: A Plea for a New American Scholar" published in Harper's Magazine in 1966. He blamed "the hideous jungle of academic bureaucracy" for making the humanities irrelevant to modern life and sacrificing education to trivial research, "the cult of the fact" and career training. Later he served on a National Endowment for the Humanities panel that issued a report in 1984 voicing similar views. He was also on the board of the American Association for Higher Education and the International Council on the Future of the University.

Arrowsmith died after suffering a heart attack at his home in Brookline, Massachusetts at age 67. An extensive tribute to Arrowsmith appeared in Arion.

Works

Notes

External links
 
James W. Tuttleton, "William Arrowsmith: a recollection" The New Criterion Online
William Arrowsmith Collection at the Harry Ransom Center

1924 births
1992 deaths
Writers from Brookline, Massachusetts
American classical scholars
Greek–English translators
National Book Award winners
The Hill School alumni
Classical scholars of the University of Texas at Austin
Classical scholars of Boston University
Classical scholars of Princeton University
Classical scholars of Yale University
Classical scholars of Johns Hopkins University
Scholars of ancient Greek literature
20th-century American translators
Translators of Ancient Greek texts